Several elections were held in the United Kingdom in 2017:

2017 United Kingdom general election
United Kingdom general election, 2017 (England)
United Kingdom general election, 2017 (Northern Ireland)
United Kingdom general election, 2017 (Scotland)
United Kingdom general election, 2017 (Wales)
List of MPs elected in the 2017 United Kingdom general election
2017 Caymanian general election
2017 Bermudian general election
2017 Falkland Islands general election
2017 Saint Helena general election
2017 United Kingdom local elections
2017 Greater Manchester mayoral election
2017 Northamptonshire County Council election
2017 Northern Ireland Assembly election
2017 City of London Corporation election
2017 Copeland by-election
2017 Stoke-on-Trent Central by-election